Melchett may refer to:

In fiction
 Lord Melchett, a character in the TV series Blackadder II
 General Melchett, a character in the TV series Blackadder Goes Forth
 Terence Melchett, a character in the Agatha Christie novel The Body in the Library

People
 Violet Mond, Baroness Melchett (1867–1945), British humanitarian and activist
 Sonia Melchett (born 1928), socialite and author
 Baron Melchett, a title in the peerage of the United Kingdom
 Alfred Moritz Mond, 1st Baron Melchett, a British industrialist, politician and political campaigner
 Henry Mond, 2nd Baron Melchett (1898–1949), British industrialist and politician
 Julian Mond, 3rd Baron Melchett (1925–1973), British industrialist
 Peter Mond, 4th Baron Melchett (aka Peter Melchett, 1948–2018), British politician and environmental activist

Other
 Melchett Medal, a fuel industry award

See also 
 Lord Melchett (disambiguation)